Vaughan Azzurri is a Canadian semi-professional soccer team based in Vaughan, Ontario, that currently competes in the League1 Ontario men's and women's divisions.  The semi-professional team was founded in 2014 by the Vaughan Soccer Club, which is a youth soccer club as part of their High Performance Program.

History 
Vaughan Soccer Club was founded in 1982 as a youth soccer club under the name Concord Jets.  In 1986, they renamed to Vaughan SC. Since 1986, the club continued to grow and by 2012, became the second largest soccer club in York Region.

Men's semi-pro team
They added their semi-professional club, under the name Vaughan Azzurri, to play in League1 Ontario in the inaugural season in 2014, originally playing out of McNaughton Park. They won the inaugural League1 Ontario League Cup defeating Sigma FC 2–1 in the final at BMO Field. They won their first league title in 2016, defeating FC London in the playoff final. This qualified them for the Inter-Provincial championship to face the champions of the Première Ligue de soccer du Québec champion CS Mont-Royal Outremont for the Canadian Division III title, where they lost over the two-legged fixture. Since then, the Azzurri have won a league-tying two League1 Ontario Championships and a league-leading three L1 Cups. 

During the 2018 season, they played a friendly against Italian professional Serie A club Frosinone Calcio, losing by a score of 2–1, although Vaughan managed to take an early 1–0 lead in the match.

From 2014 to 2018, the club was led by head coach Carmine Isacco. Following the 2018 season, Isacco left Vaughan to join the newly founded York9 FC as an assistant coach. In spring 2019, it was announced that previous First Team assistant coach and U21 head coach Patrice Gheisar would take over First Team operations. 

Having won the 2018 League1 Ontario Championship, the Azzurri were awarded a berth to the first qualifying round of 2019 Canadian Championship. They played HFX Wanderers FC of the Canadian Premier League in a two-legged series and hosted their home match at the Ontario Soccer Centre. They lost the first leg 3–2 at home after HFX scored a stoppage time penalty kick, but won the return leg in Halifax 1–0, being the first semi-professional club to defeat a professional side in the tournament. The two clubs drew 3–3 on aggregate but Vaughan failed to advance due to the away goals rule. 

At the 2020 MLS SuperDraft, Vaughan had four of their players selected in the first round of the draft. The Azzurri men went undefeated in the regular seasons of both 2021 and 2022, winning the playoff championship in 2022.

Women's semi-pro team
They added a women's club to participate in the inaugural 2015 season of the League1 Ontario women's division. The women won the 2016 League Cup. They finished first in the 2022 regular season, winning the Supporter's Trophy as regular season champions, but were defeated in the playoff semi-finals by Alliance United.

Seasons

Men

Women

Honours 
League1 Ontario Championship (3): 2016, 2018, 2022
L1 Cup (3): 2014, 2016, 2018

Notable players 
The following players have either played at the professional or international level, either before or after playing for the League1 Ontario team:

Men

Women

References

External links 

 

Association football clubs established in 2014
Soccer clubs in Ontario
League1 Ontario teams
2015 establishments in Ontario